A list of notable Slovenian sculptors:

B 
Stojan Batič
Jakov Brdar

K 
Boris Kalin
Tone Kralj

P 
Slobodan Pejić
Marko Pogačnik

R 
Miranda Rumina

S 
Jakob Savinšek

U 

Joseph Urbania

Z 
Janez Zorko
Vlasta Zorko

 
Sculptors
Slovene sculptors